Stoney Cove is a large flooded quarry which is a popular inland scuba diving site, located between Stoney Stanton and Broughton Astley in Leicestershire, England.

Background
Stoney Cove was originally a granite quarry dating back to the beginning of the 19th century. In 1850 a train line was added to move the granite more easily from the Top Pit to the centre of Stoney Stanton. Spring water was a perennial problem for the quarry, but was a boon in 1958 when quarrying at the site ceased. By 1963 diving pioneers were using the quarry to practise their hobby. Over the next fifteen years Stoney Cove was used to train North Sea oil divers and in 1978 Stoney Cove Marine Trials Ltd was formed to fully exploit the site on a commercial basis.

Scuba facilities
Stoney Cove is used for scuba diving training as well as pleasure dives and open water swimming. On shore facilities include a dive shop, diving school, cylinder filling station and a public house.
Stanegarth, claimed to be the largest inland wreck in the UK
Viscount aircraft cockpit, small aircraft wreck a Wessex helicopter
Nautilus submarine, galleon, wooden boat and a bus
Archways beneath the pub
Deep hydrobox
Submerged trees
Tower
Blow-off preventer
4-metre block house
APC

External links
Diving information website

Diving quarries in the United Kingdom
Lakes of Leicestershire
Tourist attractions in Leicestershire
Underwater diving training organizations